Kaleköy (also: Kale) is a village in the Çobanlar District, Afyonkarahisar Province, Turkey. Its population is 825 (2021).

References

Villages in Çobanlar District